Pier Maria (P.M.) Pasinetti (24 June 1913, Venice, Italy – 8 July 2006, Venice, Italy) was a novelist, professor and journalist.
 
P. M. Pasinetti went to the U.S. in 1935 to study literature and writing. He spent some time at the Louisiana State University and developed a friendship with "Southern Fellowship" poet and writer Robert Penn Warren.

Early work
Pasinetti’s first published fiction in English appeared in the Southern Review. He had been publishing journalism pieces in Italy since the age of eighteen. His first book, three novellas, was published in 1942. During World War II, he held lectureships in Goettingen, in lower Germany, and in Stockholm.

After World War II
After the war Pasinetti returned to the United States in 1946, teaching briefly at Bennington College. He studied with René Wellek and earned a doctorate in comparative literature (the first ever awarded) from Yale University. In 1949, he accepted a professorship in comparative literature and Italian at UCLA. Until his death in 2006, Pasinetti divided his time between Venice, Italy and Beverly Hills, California.

Influence in Venice
Pasinetti's family figures prominently in the artistic and cultural life of Venice. The famous Italian director Francesco Pasinetti was Pasinetti's older brother.  Considered a seminal figure in Italian cinema F. Pasinetti played an important role in Italian cinema, writing the first history of Italian filmmaking in the late 1930s. The Pasinetti Prize is awarded annually at the Venice Film Festival.  The Beverly Hills "Pasinetti House", built in 1959, was designed by Romanian-born, modernist architect Haralamb H. Georgescu, sometimes noted as Harlan Georgesco.

Brief notes on his writing and professional life
Pasinetti was a corresponding journalist for Il Corriere della Sera (1960s-1990s), writing the popular column "Dall'estrema America" ("From Farthest America"). Among his novels are: Rosso veneziano  or Venetian Red (1957),Il ponte dell'Accademia or From the Academy Bridge (1968), Melodramma  or Melodrama (1993).  Students of comparative literature may recall the Norton Anthology of World Masterpieces, versions in the 1970s and 1980s, and most recently, 1997.  Pasinetti served as an editor, with lead-anthologist Maynard Mack (Yale). Pasinetti helped found the Comparative Literature Department at UCLA, and is generally acknowledged as a pioneer in the cross-cultural study of literature in the original language. Active as a scholar well into his 90s, Pasinetti spoke on his bi-national identity as an Italian-American writer at Mount Holyoke College (April 2000): "From Venice to LA and Back: Cosmopolitanism, Writing, and Memory"

Review
A 1965 Time magazine review of P.M. Pasinetti’s book The Smile on the Face of the Lion (Random House: 1965) said this:
"While it lasts, it's a spectacular show of style. Pasinetti, a Venetian who is currently professor of Italian at U.C.L.A., seems to have derived his literary manner in equal measure from Marcel Proust, Ian Fleming, Bernard Shaw and Michelangelo Antonioni—for whom he has done odd jobs of scriptwriting. Like Antonioni, he writes pattern instead of plot, and composes episodes that go nowhere slowly. Like Proust, he wanders for pages in indirect discourse—A tells B what C said to D about E—to populate and inflect his social scene, and sinks continually into interior monologue to liberate a character's stream of consciousness.

Like Shaw, Pasinetti hits off his minor personages with one swift stroke of wit: 
"She addresses people always with the air of a lady asking for road directions from behind the wheel of an extremely classy automobile." Like Fleming, he prefers to imagine that all women' are beautiful and that sex is the supreme experience. "Her entire leg was in close contact with his, pressed against him from the hip to the ankle. He moved his hand over her face in a slow, strong caress. 'You know,' she said, 'I don't take tranquilizers any more.' "

With such prose available, there should be no need."

Film
Pasinetti made a range of small but fascinating contributions to filmmaking in Southern California in addition to his teaching, scholarship, and writing.  For Joseph L. Mankiewicz's critically acclaimed Julius Caesar, Pasinetti served as a technical advisor. Julius Caesar (1953) won the Academy Award for Best Art Direction, and was nominated for Best Actor in a Leading Role (Marlon Brando), Best Cinematography, Black-and-White, Best Music, Best Scoring of a Dramatic or Comedy Picture, and Best Picture.

Also produced in 1953, but in Italy, was Michelangelo Antonioni's evocative film La Signora senza camelie Pasinetti wrote the screenplay with Antonioni, who was related to him by marriage. In this film, he also appears among the group of guests waiting for the arrival of the actress Clara Manni (Lucia Bosè) at a private house. In 1973, Pasinetti played a small acting part in Francesco Rossi's compelling depiction of Lucky Luciano, the fabled American mafia boss who ran operations both in the US and Sicily.

Pasinetti taught both comparative literature and Italian at the University of California at Los Angeles for over 40 years.  Pasinetti served as a founding editor with Yale's Maynard Mack of the critically acclaimed Norton Anthology of World Masterpieces.  W.W. Norton & Company has been publishing this standard college text since the mid-1970s.  Pasinetti's companion essays on Erasmus'  "In Praise of Folly," and Machievelli's classic The Prince guided generations of college students. World Masterpieces is now in a seventh edition.  Pasinetti also edited both the first and second editions of Norton's new "global" Anthology of World Literature.

Pasinetti's work "5717" is included in Massimo Riva's 2007 Italian Tales: An Anthology of Contemporary Italian Fiction.

External links
Clark, William Bedford. “WARREN AND PASINETTI: A STUDY IN FRIENDSHIP.” Clemson University.
Time, 1965''
Mack, Maynard (General Editor); The Norton Anthology of World Masterpieces; Expanded Edition in One Volume.  • paper • 1997 
Mt. Holyoke College. College Street Journal. April 2000.
Italian Los Angeles: An Oral History Project. "Italian Journalists - a Little History on P.M. Pasinetti" 

Italian male journalists
Italian expatriates in the United States
Writers from Venice
1913 births
2006 deaths
20th-century Italian journalists
20th-century Italian male writers